The national emblem of the Bashkir Autonomous Soviet Socialist Republic was adopted in 1937 by the government of the Bashkir Autonomous Soviet Socialist Republic. The device is based on the emblem of the Soviet Union.

History

First revision 
The coat of arms of the Bashkir ASSR was approved at the 5th Congress of Soviets of the Bashkir ASSR on March 21–27, 1925, when the Constitution of the Bashkir ASSR was ratified (then rejected by the special commission of the Central Executive Committee of the RSFSR).
 
The coat of arms is similar the emblem of the RSFSR, but was supplemented with inscriptions in the Bashkir language.

The symbols of the BASSR were to be described in the 8th chapter of the Constitution of the Bashkir Autonomous Soviet Socialist Republic.

Proposed emblem 
In the congress, a draft proposal of the emblem of the Bashkir ASSR was designed, with the main element of which was a rider with a banner. The author of projects was A. E. Tyulkin. However, the coat of arms was not approved.

Second revision 
The Constitution (Basic Law) of Bashkiria was adopted by the Tenth Congress of Soviets on June 23, 1937. The coat of arms was described in article 111. The coat of arms still resembles the emblem of the RSFSR.

Third revision 
On May 30, 1978, the 8th Extraordinary Session of the 9th Supreme Soviet of the BASSR adopted the new Constitution of the Bashkir ASSR. The coat of arms was described in Article 157. In general, state symbols remained unchanged, and a red star is added to the emblem of the Bashkir ASSR.

Gallery

References 

Russian Soviet Federative Socialist Republic
Russian Soviet Federative Socialist Republic
Russian SFSR
Russian SFSR
Russian SFSR
Russian SFSR
Russian SFSR
Russian SFSR
Russian SFSR
Russian SFSR